Tseung Kwan O is a station on the MTR  located at the town centre of the Tseung Kwan O New Town in the New Territories of Hong Kong. The entrances to the station are on Tong Chun Street, Popcorn Mall and Tong Yin Street. A public transport interchange is located outside the station. The architecture firm Aedas designed the station.

History 
Tsueng Kwan O station opened to the public on 18 August 2002, together with the spur line to Tsueng Kwan O Depot, right next to LOHAS Park station, but the station did not open until 26 July 2009.

Station layout

Entrances/exits
A1: Tseung Kwan O Plaza / Transport Interchange 
A2: The Grandiose / Tseung Kwan O Plaza 
B1/B2: Park Central 
C: PopCorn

Hotels
Sun Hung Kai Properties developed a 359-room Crowne Plaza hotel, a 176-room Vega Suites hotel and a 300-room Holiday Inn Express hotel at Tseung Kwan O station as part of a comprehensive hotel and shopping complex.

Shopping centre
The station is attached to an MTR-owned shopping centre called PopCorn that opened in 2012. It comprises over 40,000 square metres and houses about 150 retailers and a cinema.

PopCorn is an anchor connecting the nearby malls of PopCorn 2, Park Central, and Tseung Kwan O Plaza. A public transport interchange is situated next to PopCorn and serves public light buses routes 103M, 110 and 112S, and New World First Bus routes 792M, 796C, 796S, 796X, 797M, 798 and N796.

References

MTR stations in the New Territories
Tseung Kwan O line
Railway stations in Hong Kong opened in 2002